Oberwölz Stadt is a town and a former municipality in the district of Murau in the Austrian state of Styria. Since the 2015 Styria municipal structural reform, it is part of the municipality Oberwölz.

Population

References

Rottenmann and Wölz Tauern
Cities and towns in Murau District